Worcester Public Library (formerly known as the "Worcester Free Public Library") is a public library in downtown Worcester, Massachusetts. It was founded in 1859 when local resident John Green donated his personal library to the city for public use. In 2004, the Worcester Library Foundation was established to raise funds and promote the library. In fiscal year 2009, the city of Worcester spent 1.14% ($4,817,006) of its budget on the library—some $26 per person.

Subscription databases
As of 2021, the Worcester Public Library provides access to the following databases for its patrons:

 American Ancestors
 Ancestry.com
 A to Z Databases
BookFlix
 Boston Globe
 Britannica
 Chilton Auto Repair
 Consumer Reports
 Freegal Music
 Foundation Directory Online
 Gale Databases 
 Gale Academic Onefile 
 Gale Academic Onefile Select 
 Gale Business: Entrepreneurship 
 Gale E-Reference Titles 
 Gale in Context: Biography 
 Gale in Context: Elementary 
 Gale in Context: Global Issues 
 Gale in Context: Opposing Viewpoints 
 Gale in Context: Science 
 Gale in Context: U.S. History 
 Gale in Context: World History 
 Gale Directory Library 
 Gale General OneFile 
 Gale Health and Wellness 
 Gale Literature 
 Gale Literature Resource Center 
 Gale  OneFile: Criminal Justice 
 Gale OneFile: Culinary Arts 
 Gale OneFile: Educator's Reference Complete 
 Gale OneFile: Environmental Studies & Policy Collection 
 Gale OneFile: Health & Medicine 
 Gale OneFile: High School Edition 
 Gale OneFile: Hospitality and Tourism 
 Gale OneFile: News 
 Gale OneFile: Nursing and Allied Health 
 Gale OneFile: Physical Therapy & Sports Medicine 
 Gale OneFile: Vocations & Careers 
 Gale Virtual Reference Library 
 Greenfile (EBSCO) 
 Heritage Quest
 Hoopla
 HelpNow Online Tutoring
 Infobase eBooks
 JSTOR (access limited to citations only)
 Kanopy
 LearningExpress Library (EBSCO)
 Library, Information Science, and Technology Abstracts (EBSCO)
Mango Languages
 Massachusetts Permit Practice Test
 Morningstar Investment Research center
 New York Times
 NewsBank - America's News
 Newsletter on Intellectual Freedom
 NOAA Climatological Data for Worcester
 Novelist Plus (EBSCO)
 Overdrive C/W Mars Digital Catalog
 Oxford Dictionaries
 Peterson's Career Prep
 PhotoFacts Online (SAMS)
 Reference Solutions (formerly RefUSA)
 Teacher's Reference Center
 Telegram & Gazette (Worcester, 1989 - Current)
 Teenbook Cloud
 Tumblebook Library
 WorldCat

History 

The Worcester Public Library originated in 1859 with a donation of 7,000 volumes from Dr. John Green III. Dr. Green was a Worcester-born "physician, dentist, surgeon, apothecary and man-midwife." In 1855, Green had donated 5,000 volumes from his personal collection to the Worcester Lyceum on a 5-year loan; as the loan was about to expire, Dr. Green decided to establish a free public library for the city. The original location of the library was the third floor of the Bank Block at Foster and Main Streets, but by 1861 an official library building had been constructed on Elm Street. The cornerstone of this library was laid on July 4, 1860. The construction of this library building satisfied Dr. Green's condition on his donation that "a suitable building should be provided for [the books], and that they should not be taken from the library room but freely read there at all times when the rooms are open." On December 8, 1872, the Free Public Library opened on Sundays, which was a momentous enough occasion to be recorded in The Worcester Book. By 1886, the total number of volumes in the library's collection was nearly 60,000.

In 1914, three new branches were introduced to the Worcester Public Library system. The branches, Greendale (later renamed Frances Perkins), Quinsigamond, and South Worcester, were all established with the help of grants from Andrew Carnegie. Throughout the 20th century, three other branches, including Billings Square, Tatnuck, and Main South were constructed, but all six of these libraries closed in 1990 (Frances Perkins reopened in 1992). The main branch of the library moved from Elm Street to its current location at Salem Square in 1964, and the current building was constructed in 2001.

Bookmobile 
The WPL has always been devoted to serving the Worcester community, and in 1940 the WPL's first Bookmobile was launched. The Bookmobile was intended to provide library services for areas of Worcester that could not reach one of the regular library branches, and the program was a huge success. In its first week, 2,500 of the 2,700 volumes carried by the Bookmobile were checked out. The Bookmobile eventually began circulating more volumes than any one branch of the WPL. In 1991, Bookmobile services were discontinued, but in 2012 the WPL launched the Mobile Library Branch, Library Express (Libby). Based on Libby's success, a second bookmobile named Lilly was launched in 2014, and in 2018 the Libby bookmobile was upgraded.

Services 
In addition to the regular circulation services, the WPL provides a number of other services. For New Americans and English Learners, the library provides print and audio resources for learning English, as well as information about applying for citizenship and even weekly classes to assist patrons in passing citizenship exams. The library also offers classes and one-on-one resume-writing workshops. The WPL also offers a Talking Book Library to its patrons with visual or other physical disabilities, who cannot read traditional print materials; the Talking Book Library provides resources in large type, braille, and described videos.

Notable Staff 

 Samuel Swett Green

Branches

External links

References

Libraries in Worcester, Massachusetts
Public libraries in Massachusetts
1859 establishments in Massachusetts